The 1973 FA Trophy Final was a football match between Scarborough and Wigan Athletic on 28 April 1973 at the Wembley Stadium, London. It was the final match of the 1972–73 FA Trophy, the fourth season of the FA Trophy, The Football Association's cup competition for non-league clubs in the English football league system. Both teams were making their first appearance in the final and it was the first in the competition's history to not feature a team from the Southern League. The match was won 2–1 by Scarborough after extra time.

Match

Details

References

FA Trophy Finals
FA Trophy Final
FA Trophy Final
FA Trophy Final
Fa Trophy Final 1973
Fa Trophy Final 1973
Events at Wembley Stadium